The Bengal Army was the army of the Bengal Presidency, one of the three presidencies of British India within the British Empire.

The presidency armies, like the presidencies themselves, belonged to the East India Company (EIC) until the Government of India Act 1858 (passed in the aftermath of the Indian Rebellion of 1857) transferred all three presidencies to the direct authority of the British Crown.

In 1895 all three presidency armies were merged into the Indian Army.

History

Origins

The Bengal Army originated with the establishment of a European Regiment in 1756. While the East India Company had previously maintained a small force of Dutch and Eurasian mercenaries in Bengal, this was destroyed when Calcutta was captured by the Nawab of Bengal on 30 June that year.

Under East India Company

In 1757 the first locally recruited unit of Bengal sepoys was created in the form of the Lal Paltan battalion. It was recruited from soldiers that had served in the Nawab's Army from Bihar and the Awadh (Oudh) who were collectively called Purbiyas. Drilled and armed along British army lines this force served well at the Battle of Plassey in 1757 and 20 more Indian battalions were raised by 1764. In 1766 the Monghyr Mutiny, quelled by Robert Clive, affected many of the white officers of the Bengal Army.

The EIC steadily expanded its Bengal Army and by 1796 the establishment was set at three battalions of European artillery, three regiments of European infantry, ten regiments of Indian cavalry and twelve regiments (each of two battalions) of Indian infantry.

In 1824 the Bengal Army underwent reorganisation, with the regular infantry being grouped into 68 single battalion regiments numbered according to their date of establishment. Nine additional infantry regiments were subsequently raised, though several existing units were disbanded between 1826 and 1843. On the eve of the First Afghan War (1839–42) the Bengal Army had achieved a dominant role in the forces of the HEIC. There were 74 battalions of Bengal regular infantry against only 52 from Madras, 26 from Bombay and 24 British (Queen's and Company). On average an inch and a half taller and a stone heavier than the southern Indian troops, the Bengal sepoy was highly regarded by a military establishment that tended to evaluate its soldiers by physical appearance.

A new feature in the Bengal Army was the creation of irregular infantry and cavalry regiments during the 1840s. Originally designated as "Local Infantry" these were permanently established units but with less formal drill and fewer British officers than the regular Bengal line regiments.

The main source of recruitment continued to be high caste Brahmins and Rajputs from Bengal, Bihar and Oudh, although the eight regular cavalry regiments consisted mainly of Muslim sowars from the Indian Muslim biradaris such as the Ranghar (Rajput Muslims), Sheikhs, Sayyids, Mughals, and Hindustani Pathans.

Another innovation introduced prior to 1845 was to designate specific regiments as "Volunteers" – that is recruited for general service, with sepoys who had accepted a commitment for possible overseas duty. Recruits for the Bengal Army who were prepared to travel by ship if required, received a special allowance or batta. Two of these BNI regiments were serving in China in 1857 and so escaped any involvement in the great rebellion of that year.

The East India Company's Bengal Army in 1857 (Bombay and Madras had their own armies) consisted of 151,361 men of all ranks, of whom the great majority - 128,663 - were Indians.

1857
A total of 64 Bengal Army regular infantry and cavalry regiments rebelled during the Indian Rebellion of 1857, or were disbanded after their continued loyalty was considered doubtful. From 1858 onwards the actual high-caste Awadhi, Bengali and Bihari Hindu presence in the Bengal Army was reduced because of their perceived primary role as "mutineers" in the 1857 rebellion. The new and less homogeneous Bengal Army was essentially drawn from Punjabi Muslims, Sikhs, Gurkhas, Baluchis and Pathans, although twelve of the pre-mutiny Bengal line infantry regiments continued in service with the same basis of recruitment, traditions and uniform colours as before.

A largely unspoken rationale was that an army of diverse origins was unlikely to unite in rebellion.

Post 1857

End of the separate Bengal Army

In 1895 the three separate Presidency Armies began a process of unification which was not to be concluded until the Kitchener reforms of eight years later.
As an initial step the Army of India was divided into four commands, each commanded by a lieutenant-general. These comprised Bengal, Bombay (including Aden), Madras (including Burma) and Punjab (including the North West Frontier). In 1903 the separately numbered regiments of the Bombay, Madras and Bengal Armies were unified in a single organisational sequence and the presidency affiliations disappeared.

The Bengal infantry units in existence at the end of the Presidency era continued as the senior regiments (1st Brahmans to 48th Pioneers) of the newly unified Indian Army.

Ethnic composition
The Bengal Army of the East India Company was mainly recruited from high castes living in Bengal, Bihar and the Awadh.

Writing in The Indian Army (1834), Sir John Malcolm, who had a lifetime's experience of Indian soldiering, wrote:  "They consist largely of Rajpoots (Rajput), who are a distinguished race. We may judge of the size of these men when we are told that the height below which no recruit is taken is five feet six inches. The great proportion of the Grenadiers are six feet and upwards."

Both prior to and following 1857, the Bengal Army included what were to become some of the most famous units in India: Skinner's Horse from Bengal, the Gurkhas from the Himalayas and the Corps of Guides on the Khyber-Pakhtunkhwa.

Structure

Cavalry

Regular regiments
Governor General's Bodyguard
1st to 10th Bengal Light Cavalry Regiments (see 3rd and 5th Regiments). Eight of these regular regiments mutinied and two were disbanded during 1857–58. None were carried over into the post-Mutiny army.
1st to 4th Bengal European Light Cavalry Regiments. Recruited hastily in Britain in November 1857 to replace the eight regiments of Bengal Light Cavalry which had mutinied. The mention of "European" in the name indicated that it consisted of white soldiers rather than Indian sowars. In 1861, all four European regiments were transferred to the British Army as the 19th, 20th and 21st Hussars.

Irregular units

1st Irregular Cavalry (Skinner's Horse)
2nd to 18th Irregular Cavalry Regiments
Bundelkhand Legion Cavalry
Gwalior Contingent Cavalry
Kotah Contingent Cavalry
Bhopal Contingent Cavalry
United Malwa Contingent Cavalry
Ramgarh Irregular Cavalry
Nagpore Irregular Cavalry
1st to 3rd Oudh Irregular Cavalry Regiments
1st, 2nd and 3rd Regiments of Hodson's Horse
1st to 4th Sikh Irregular Cavalry Regiments
The Jat Horse Yeomanry
Rohilkhand Horse
The Muttra Horse
Alexander's Horse
Barrow's Volunteers
Behar Irregular Cavalry
Belooch Horse
Benares Horse
Bengal Yeomanry Cavalry
Calcutta Volunteer Guards
De Kantzow's Irregular Cavalry
Graham's Horse
2nd Gwalior Cavalry
2nd Gwalior Mahratta Horse
H.H. The Guicowar's Horse
Jackson's Volunteer Horse
Jellandhar Cavalry
Lahore Light Horse
1st Mahratta Horse
Meerut Light Horse
Peshawar Light Horse
Rajghazi Volunteer Cavalry
The Volunteer Cavalry
Lind's and Cureton's Risalahs of Pathan Horse
2nd Mahratta Horse
Fane's Horse
The Corps of Guides, Punjab Irregular Force
1st to 5th Regiments of Cavalry of the Punjab Irregular Force

Artillery
The Bengal Artillery was divided into three 'sections', the Bengal Horse Artillery (affiliated with the Royal Horse Artillery), Bengal European Foot Artillery (European/white members), and the Bengal Native Foot Artillery (native Indians).  Below is the list of those that were formed/active before their disbandment/absorption into the Royal Artillery and RHA.  Units below will have their formation designation and then designation after joining the British Army.

Bengal Horse Artillery

 Bengal Horse Artillery:
 1st Brigade, Bengal Horse Artillery (formed in 1824)
 1st Troop (formed 1800, transferred to Royal Horse Artillery 1864), formed as Experimental Brigade, HA then The Troop, then 1st Troop, BenHA
 2nd Troop (formed 1824, transferred to Royal Horse Artillery 1864)
 3rd Troop (formed 1824, transferred to Royal Horse Artillery 1864)
 (1st) 4th (Native) Troop (formed in 1817, left to 3rd Bde 1827)
 (2nd) 4th (Native) Troop (formed 1827, mutinied in Neemuch, then reformed as European troop, disbanded in 1862)
 5th (Shah Soojah's) Troop (Native, formed 1838, then reformed as European troop, transferred to Royal Horse Artillery 1864)
 2nd Brigade, Bengal Horse Artillery (formed in 1825)
 1st Troop (formed 1809, transferred to Royal Horse Artillery 1864), formed as 2nd Trp, BenHA
 2nd (Rocket) Troop (formed 1816, transferred to Royal Horse Artillery 1864), formed as The Rocket Troop, BenHA
 3rd Troop (formed 1825, transferred to Royal Horse Artillery 1864)
 (1st) 4th (Native) Troop (formed 1817, joined 1st Bde 1827), formed as 5th (Native) Trp, BenHA
 (2nd) 4th (Native) Troop (formed 1827, joined 3rd Bde 1829)
 (3rd) 4th (Native) Troop (formed 1829, reformed as European trp 1859, transferred to Royal Horse Artillery 1864)
 3rd Brigade, Bengal Horse Artillery (formed in 1825)
 1st Troop (formed in 1809, transferred to Royal Horse Artillery 1864), formed as 3rd Trp, BenHA
 2nd Troop (formed 1825, transferred to Royal Horse Artillery 1864)
 3rd Troop (formed 1825, transferred to Royal Horse Artillery 1864)
 (1st) 4th (Native) Troop (formed 1817, joined 2nd Bde 1829), formed as 6th Trop, BenHA
 (2nd) 4th (Native) Troop (formed 1827, to 2nd Bde 1829)
 (3rd) 4th (Native) Troop (formed 1829, mutinied in Multan, reformed 1859 as European troop, transferred to Royal Horse Artillery 1864)

Bengal European Foot Artillery
 1st Company Bengal Artillery (raised in 1749, currently 9 (Plassey) Battery Royal Artillery)

Bengal Native Foot Artillery

 Bengal Native Foot Artillery: (units listed in after precedence #)
 1st Bengal Artillery Battalion
 7th Company (raised in 1780, late 1st Battery, 16th Brigade Royal Artillery)
 3rd Company (raised 1780, late 2nd Bty, 16th Bde RA)
9th Company (raised 1780, late 3rd Bty, 16th Bde RA)
Fort William Company (raised 1780, late 4th Bty, 16th Bde RA)
Calcutta Garrison Company (raised 1770, late 1st Company, 6th Battalion)
6th Company (raised 1802, late 3rd Co, 3rd Btn)
7th Company (raised 1802, late 4th Co, 3rd Btn)
8th Company (raised 1817, late 3rd Co, 1st Btn)
2nd Bengal Artillery Battalion
8th Company (raised 1778, late 1st Bty, 19th Bde RA)
4th Company (raised 1763, late 2nd Bty, 19th Bde RA)
6th Company (raised 1778, late 3rd Bty, 19th Bde RA)
2nd Company (raised 1780, late 4th Bty, 19th Bde RA)
10th Company (raised 1780, late 2nd Co, 6th Btn)
6th Company (raised 1802, late 3rd Co, 2nd Btn)
7th Company (raised 1802, late 4th Co, 2nd Btn)
8th Company (raised 1818, late 3rd Co, 5th Btn)
3rd Bengal Artillery Battalion
1st Company (raised 1786, late 1st Bty, 22nd Bde RA)
2nd Company (raised 1786, late 2nd Bty, 22nd Bde RA)
3rd Company (raised 1786, late 3rd Bty, 22nd Bde RA)
4th Company (raised 1786, late 4th Bty, 22nd Bde RA)
5th Company (raised 1786, late 3rd Co, 6th Btn)
6th Company (raised 1802, late 2nd Co, 5th Btn)
7th Company (raised 1802, disbanded 1824)
8th Company (raised 1818, late 4th Co, 5th Btn)
4th Bengal Artillery Battalion
1st Company (raised 1824, late 1st Bty, 24th Bde RA)
2nd Company (raised 1824, late 2nd Bty, 2nd Bde RA)
3rd Company (raised 1824, late 3rd Bty, 24th Bde RA)
4th Company (raised 1824, late 4th Bty, 24th Bde RA)
5th Company (raised 1842, late 4th Bty, 6th Btn)
5th Bengal Artillery Battalion
1st Company (raised 1824, late 1st Bty, 25th Bde RA)
2nd Company (raised 1824, late 2nd Bty, 25th Bde RA)
3rd Company (raised 1824, late 3rd Bty, 25th Bde RA)
4th Company (raised 1824, late 4th Bty, 25th Bde RA)
5th Company (Raised 1842, disbanded 1845)
6th Bengal Artillery Battalion
1st Company (raised 1845, late 5th Bty, 16th Bde RA)
2nd Company (raised 1845, late 5th Bty, 19th Bde RA)
3rd Company (raised 1845, late 5th Bty, 22nd Bde RA)
4th Company (raised 1845, late 5th Bty, 24th Bde RA)

Punjab Horse Artillery, Punjab Irregular Force

Engineers
The Corps of Bengal Sappers and Miners
The Sebundy Sappers and Miners

Infantry

Regular regiments

1st Bengal (European) Fusiliers
2nd Bengal (European) Fusiliers
3rd Bengal (European) Light Infantry
4th, 5th and 6th Bengal European Regiments
1st to 74th Regiments of Bengal Native Infantry (including Goorkha 66th Regiment of Bengal Native Infantry). Of these regular regiments only twelve (the 21st, 31st, 32nd 33rd, 42nd, 43rd, 47th 59th, 63rd, 65th, 66th and 70th BNI) escaped mutiny or disbandment to survive into the post-Mutiny army. As such they retained a number of features and traditions of the "old" Bengal Army, such as the wearing of red coats. The remainder of the regiments making up the "new" Bengal Army were derived from a mixture of irregular units already in existence before the Mutiny, plus Punjabis, Sikhs and Gurkhas. Local corps, levies and even police battalions raised for the suppression of the Mutiny were in some cases transformed into new regular infantry regiments, which brought the total number up to 49.

Irregular units
Alipore Regiment
The Ramgarh Light Infantry
3rd Local Battalion
The Sirmoor Rifle Regiment
The Kamaoon Battalion
1st Assam Light Infantry
11th Sylhet Local Light Infantry
The Mhairwara Battalion
2nd Assam Light Infantry
Joudpore Legion (1836–1857) – a mixed unit of cavalry, infantry, and artillery (a two-gun battery)
43rd Erinpura Regiment (1860–1921) – former Erinpura Irregular Force, itself a successor to the loyal companies of the Joudpore Legion
Oudh Irregular Force
Narbudda Sebundy Corps
Shekhawati Battalion
Harianna Light Infantry
Regiment of Khelat-i-Gilzie
Malwa Bheel Corps
Kotah Contingent
Mehidpore Contingent
Gwalior Contingent
Malwa Contingent
Bhopal Contingent
Ferozepore Regiment
Regiment of Ludhiana
Camel Corps
Nusseree Battalion
Nagpore Irregular Force
Deoli Irregular Force
Regiment of Lucknow
Mhair Regiment
Kamroop Regiment
Landhoor Rangers
Kuppurthala Contingent
1st and 2nd Gwalior Regiments
Allahabad Levy
Shahjehanpur Levy
Cawnpore Levy
Fatehgarh Levy
Moradabad Levy
Mynpoorie Levy
Sealkote Infantry Levy
Bareilly Levy
Goojramwallah Levy
Meerut Levy
Kumaon Levy
Agra Levy
Cole and Sonthal Levy
Rajpoot Levy
Loyal Purbeah Regiment
Corps of Guides, Punjab Irregular Force
1st to 4th Sikh Infantry Regiments of the Punjab Irregular Force
1st to 6th Punjab Infantry Regiments of the Punjab Irregular Force
7th to 24th Regiments of Punjab Infantry, of which the 15th and 24th were pioneer regiments

Other
1st Bengal Military Police Battalion

Commanders
Because the Bengal Army was the largest of the three Presidency Armies, its Commander-in-Chief was, from 1853 to 1895, also Commander-in-Chief, India.
Commander-in-Chief, Bengal Command
 Lieutenant-General Sir William Elles (1895–1896)
 Lieutenant-General Sir Baker Russell (1896–1898)
 Lieutenant-General Sir George Luck (1898–1903)
 Lieutenant-General Sir Alfred Gaselee (1903–1907)

See also
 Presidency armies
 Bombay Army
 Madras Army

References

Sources

Further reading
Stubbs, Francis W. Major-General., History of the Organization, Equipment, And War Services of the Regiment of Bengal Artillery, Compiled From Published Works, Official Records, And Various Private Sources (London. Volumes 1 & 2. Henry S. King, 1877. Volume 3. W.H. Allen, 1895). A full detailed history with maps, appendices, etc.
Cardew, F. G., Sketch of the Services of the Bengal Native Army: To the Year 1895 (Calcutta: Office of the Superintendent of Government Printing, 1903, reprinted by Naval and Military Press Ltd., 2005) Contents: Chapter I: 1599–1767; II. 1767–1796; III. 1797–1814; IV. 1814–1824; V. 1824–1838; VI. 1838–1845; VII. 1845–1857; VIII. 1857–1861; IX. 1862–1979; X. 1878–1881; XI. 1882–1890; XII. 1891–1895; Appendix: I. A Chronological List of the Corps of the Bengal Army, Showing particulars of their origin and their subsequent history; II. Existing Corps of the Bengal Army, Showing Dates of Raising and Changes in their Titles; III. Commanders-in-chief of the Bengal Army; IV. Chronology list of the Services of the Bengal Native Army; Index.
 
 Stanley, Peter, White Mutiny: British Military Culture in India 1825–75 (Christopher Hurst, London, 1998).
 J.B.M. Frederick, Lineage Book of British Land Forces 1660–1978, Vol II, Wakefield, Microform Academic, 1984, .

British East India Company
Military of British India
Military history of the British East India Company
History of the Bengal Sappers
Bengal Presidency
1756 establishments in the British Empire
Military units and formations established in 1756